The 50th Annual Grammy Awards took place at the Staples Center in Los Angeles, on February 10, 2008. It honored musical achievement of 2007 in which albums were released between October 1, 2006, through September 30, 2007. The primary ceremonies were televised in the US on CBS; however, as has become the custom, most of the awards were handed out during a pre-telecast portion of the show held at the Los Angeles Convention Center and broadcast on XM Satellite Radio. Two nights prior to the show Aretha Franklin was honored as the MusiCares Person of the Year.

The year's big winner was Amy Winehouse: the 24-year-old singer had recently entered a drug rehabilitation program and did not come to Los Angeles. American officials initially refused her a work visa; they reversed the decision, but by then it was too late for her to make the trip from the UK.  She became the fifth female solo artist to get five awards in one night, alongside Lauryn Hill, Norah Jones, Alicia Keys, Beyoncé and later, Alison Krauss, Adele and Billie Eilish.

The golden anniversary of the Grammys and NARAS was noted in references and performances throughout this year's ceremony. Alicia Keys was the evening's opening musician, singing and playing piano alongside archived video and audio of Frank Sinatra. Other collaborative performances linking contemporary and past musicians included Beyoncé with Tina Turner, Rihanna with The Time, classical pianist Lang Lang with jazz pianist Herbie Hancock and inaugural Grammy winner Keely Smith with Kid Rock. Special recognition of the musical contributions of The Beatles also featured.  The Foo Fighters won Best Rock Album and performed their nominated song "The Pretender" in a highly collaborative performance that involved a social media selection of classical musicians (the "My Grammy Moment" YouTube contest was won by violinist Ann Marie Calhoun).

Performances

Presenters
The following is an alphabetical list of presenters.

Akon
Jason Bateman
Tony Bennett
Dierks Bentley
Chris Brown
Cher
Natalie Cole
Mike Shinoda
Boys Like Girls
Kermit the Frog
Cuba Gooding Jr.
Juanes
Tom Hanks
Quincy Jones
Carole King
Solange Knowles
Cyndi Lauper
John Legend
George Lopez
Lyle Lovett
Ludacris
Joe Mantegna
Bette Midler
Prince
Bonnie Raitt
Roselyn Sanchez
Keely Smith
Ringo Starr
Dave Stewart
Taylor Swift
Usher
will.i.am
Andy Williams
Stevie Wonder

Winners and nominees
Bold type indicates the winner out of the list of nominees.

Multiple nominees and wins (wins/nominations)

 Amy Winehouse (5/6)
 Kanye West (4/8)
 Foo Fighters (2/5)
 Justin Timberlake (2/3)
 Herbie Hancock (2/3)
 Rihanna (1/6)

General
Record of the Year
"Rehab" – Amy Winehouse
Mark Ronson, producer; Tom Elmhirst, Mark Ronson, Dom Morley, Vaughan Merrick & Gabriel Roth, engineers/mixers
"Irreplaceable" – Beyoncé
Beyoncé Knowles, Ne-Yo & Stargate, producers; Jim Caruana, Jason Goldstein & Geoff Rice, engineers/mixers
"The Pretender" – Foo Fighters
Gil Norton, producer; Adrian Bushby & Rich Costey, engineers/mixers
"Umbrella" – Rihanna featuring Jay-Z
Kuk Harrell & C. "Tricky" Stewart, producers; Kuk Harrell & Manny Marroquin, engineers/mixers
"What Goes Around... Comes Around" – Justin Timberlake
Nate (Danja) Hills, Timbaland & Justin Timberlake, producers; Jimmy Douglass & Timbaland, engineers/mixers

Album of the Year
River: The Joni Letters – Herbie HancockLeonard Cohen, Norah Jones, Joni Mitchell, Corinne Bailey Rae, Luciana Souza & Tina Turner, featured artists; Herbie Hancock & Larry Klein, producers; Helik Hadar, engineer/mixer; Bernie Grundman, mastering engineerEchoes, Silence, Patience & Grace – Foo Fighters
Gil Norton, producer; Adrian Bushby & Rich Costey, engineers/mixers; Brian Gardner, mastering engineer
These Days – Vince Gill
John Anderson, Guy Clarke, Rodney Crowell, Diana Krall, Amy Grant & The Del McCoury Band, featured artists; Vince Gill, John Hobbs & Justin Niebank, producers; Neal Cappellino & Justin Niebank, engineers/mixers; Adam Ayan, mastering engineer
Graduation – Kanye West
Dwele, Lil Wayne, Mos Def & T-Pain, featured artists; Warryn "Baby Dubb" Campbell, Eric Hudson, Brian "Allday" Miller, Nottz, Patrick "Plain Pat" Reynolds, Gee Roberson, Toomp & Kanye West, producers; Bruce Beuchner, Andrew Dawson, Mike Dean, Anthony Kilhoffer, Greg Koller, Manny Marroquin, Nottz Raw, Tony Rey, Seiji Sekine, Paul Sheehy & D. Sloan, engineers/mixers; Vlado Meller, mastering engineer
Back to Black – Amy Winehouse
Mark Ronson & Salaamremi, producers; Tom Elmhirst, Mark Ronson, Matt Paul, Dom Morley, Vaughan Merrick, Gabriel Roth, Derek Pacuk, Gary Noble & Franklin Socorro, engineers/mixers; Stuart Hawkes, mastering engineer

Song of the Year"Rehab" Amy Winehouse, songwriter (Amy Winehouse)"Before He Cheats"
 Josh Kear & Chris Tompkins, songwriters (Carrie Underwood)
"Hey There Delilah"
 Tom Higgenson, songwriter (Plain White T's)
"Like a Star" 
 Corinne Bailey Rae, songwriter (Corinne Bailey Rae)
"Umbrella"
 Shawn Carter, Kuk Harrell, Terius "Dream" Nash, & Christopher Stewart, songwriters (Rihanna featuring Jay-Z)

Best New ArtistAmy WinehouseFeist
Ledisi
Paramore
Taylor Swift

Alternative
Best Alternative Music AlbumIcky Thump – The White Stripes
Alright, Still – Lily Allen
Neon Bible – Arcade Fire
Volta – Björk
Wincing the Night Away – The Shins

Blues
Best Traditional Blues Album
Last of the Great Mississippi Delta Bluesmen: Live In Dallas – Henry James Townsend, Joe Willie "Pinetop" Perkins, Robert Lockwood Jr. & David Honeyboy Edwards
Pinetop Perkins on the 88's: Live in Chicago – Pinetop Perkins
Live...and in Concert from San Francisco – Otis Rush
10 Days Out: Blues from the Backroads – Kenny Wayne Shepherd featuring Various Artists
Old School – Koko Taylor

Best Contemporary Blues Album
The Road to Escondido – J. J. Cale & Eric Clapton
Into the Blues – Joan Armatrading
Is It News – Doyle Bramhall
Truth – Robben Ford
The Scene of the Crime – Bettye LaVette

Children's
Best Children's Music Album
A Green and Red Christmas – The Muppets
Chickens – Buck Howdy with BB
Experience...101 – Sweet Honey in the Rock
I Wanna Play – Bill Harley
My Green Kite – Peter Himmelman
The Velveteen Rabbit: Love Can Make You Real – Various Artists

Best Children's Spoken Word Album
Harry Potter and the Deathly Hallows – Jim Dale
Making the Heart Whole Again: Stories for a Wounded World – Milbre Burch
The One and Only Shrek – Meryl Streep & Stanley Tucci
Who's Got Game? The Ant or the Grasshopper? The Lion or the Mouse? Poppy or the Snake? – Toni Morrison
Wickety Whack: Brer Rabbit Is Back – Diane Ferlatte

Classical
Best Classical Album
Cherubini: Missa Solemnis in E
Riccardo Muti, conductor; Wilhelm Meister, producer (Ildar Abdrazakov, Herbert Lippert, Marianna Pizzolato & Ruth Ziesak; Symphonieorchester Des Bayerischen Rundfunks)
Grechaninov: Passion Week
Charles Bruffy, conductor; Blanton Alspaugh, producer (Kansas City Chorale & Phoenix Bach Choir)
Homage: The Age of the Diva
Renée Fleming; David Frost, producer (Valery Gergiev; Orchestra Of The Mariinsky Theatre)
Lorraine Hunt Lieberson Sings Peter Lieberson: Neruda Songs
Lorraine Hunt Lieberson; Dirk Sobotka, producer (James Levine; Boston Symphony Orchestra)
Tower: Made In America
Leonard Slatkin, conductor; Tim Handley, producer (Nashville Symphony)

Best Orchestra Performance
"Beethoven: Symphony No. 9"
Osmo Vänskä, conductor (Minnesota Orchestra)
"Shostakovich: The Golden Age"
José Serebrier, conductor (Royal Scottish National Orchestra)
"Stravinsky: Le Sacre Du Printemps"
Esa–Pekka Salonen, conductor (Los Angeles Philharmonic)
"Tower: Made in America"
Leonard Slatkin, conductor (Nashville Symphony)
"Vaughan Williams: Symphony No. 5, Fantasia on a Theme of Thomas Tallis, Serenade to Music"
Robert Spano, conductor (Atlanta Symphony Orchestra)

Best Opera Recording
"Albéniz: Pepita Jiménez"
José De Eusebio, conductor; Enrique Baquerizo, Carlos Chausson, Plácido Domingo, Jane Henschel & Carol Vaness; Michael Haas, producer (Orquesta Y Coro De La Comunidad De Madrid)
"Donizetti: Dom Sébastien, Roi De Portugal"
Mark Elder, conductor; Carmelo Corrado Caruso, Giuseppe Filianoti, Vesselina Kasarova, Simon Keenlyside & Alastair Miles; Patric Schmid, producer (The Royal Opera Chorus; The Orchestra of the Royal Opera House, Covent Garden)
"Humperdinck: Hansel & Gretel"
Sir Charles Mackerras, conductor; Rebecca Evans, Jane Henschel & Jennifer Larmore; Brian Couzens, producer (Sarah Coppen, Diana Montague & Sarah Tynan; New London Children's Choir; Philharmonia Orchestra)
"Lully: Thésée"
Paul O'Dette & Stephen Stubbs, conductors; Howard Crook, Ellen Hargis, Laura Pudwell & Harry Van Der Kamp; Renate Wolter–Seevers, producer (Boston Early Music Festival Chorus; Boston Early Music Festival Orchestra)
"Verdi: La Traviata"
Zubin Mehta, conductor; Piotr Beczala, Paolo Gavanelli & Anja Harteros; Andreas Caemmerer & Felix Gargerle, producers (Choir Of The Bavarian State Opera; Bavarian State Orchestra)

Best Choral Performance
"Brahms: Ein Deutsches Requiem"
Simon Rattle, conductor; Simon Halsey, chorus master (Thomas Quasthoff & Dorothea Röschmann; Rundfunkchor Berlin; Berliner Philharmoniker)
"Cherubini: Missa Solemnis in E"
Riccardo Muti, conductor; Peter Dijkstra, chorus master (Ildar Abdrazakov, Herbert Lippert, Marianna Pizzolato & Ruth Ziesak; Chor Des Bayerischen Rundfunks; Symphonieorchester des Bayerischen Rundfunks)
"Grechaninov: Passion Week"
Charles Bruffy, conductor (Kansas City Chorale & Phoenix Bach Choir)
"Penderecki: Symphony No. 7 'Seven Gates Of Jerusalem'"
Antoni Wit, conductor; Henryk Wojnarowski, chorus master (Boris Carmeli, Ewa Marciniec, Aga Mikolaj, Wieslaw Ochman, Olga Pasichnyk & Romuald Tesarowicz; Warsaw National Philharmonic Choir; Warsaw National Philharmonic Orchestra)
"Schönberg: Gurre-Lieder
Michael Gielen, conductor; Howard Arman & Michael Gläser, choir directors (Melanie Diener, Ralf Lukas, Yvonne Naef, Andreas Schmidt, Gerhard Siegel & Robert Dean Smith; Chor des Bayerischen Rundfunks & MDR Rundfunkchor Leipzig; SWR Sinfonieorchester Baden-Baden und Freiburg)

Best Instrumental Soloist(s) Performance (with Orchestra)
"Barber/Korngold/Walton: Violin Concertos"
Bramwell Tovey, conductor; James Ehnes (Vancouver Symphony Orchestra)
"Beethoven: Piano Concertos Nos. 1 & 4"
Christoph Eschenbach, conductor; Lang Lang (Orchestre De Paris)
"Nielsen: Clarinet & Flute Concertos"
Simon Rattle, conductor; Sabine Meyer & Emmanuel Pahud (Berliner Philharmoniker)
"Rózsa: Violin Concerto, Op. 24"
Dmitry Yablonsky, conductor; Anastasia Khitruk (Russian Philharmonic Orchestra)
"Tchaikovsky/Saint-Saëns/Ginastera"
Ari Rasilainen, conductor; Sol Gabetta (Münchner Rundfunkorchester)

Best Instrumental Soloist Performance (without Orchestra)
"Beethoven Sonatas, Vol. 3" – Garrick Ohlsson
"Haydn: Piano Sonatas" – Marc-André Hamelin
"Louisiana: A Pianist's Journey" – Kenneth Boulton
"Solo Piazzolla" – Manuel Barrueco
"20th Century Piano Sonatas" – Allison Brewster Franzetti

Best Chamber Music Performance
"On the Threshold of Hope" – Artists Of The Royal Conservatory Ensemble (Richard Margison, Joaquin Valdepeñas & Diane Werner)
"Saint-Saëns/Poulenc/Devienne/Milhaud" – Oleg Maisenberg & Sabine Meyer
"Strange Imaginary Animals" – Eighth Blackbird
"Tchaikovsky: Three String Quartets, Souvenir De Florence" – Ying Quartet (James Dunham & Paul Katz)
"30 Songs of the Russian People" – Joseph Banowetz & Alton Chung Ming Chan

Best Small Ensemble Performance
"Bach: Brandenburg Concertos" – Swiss Baroque Soloists
"Bridges: Eddie Daniels Plays the Music of Frank Proto" – Frank Proto, conductor; Eddie Daniels; Ensemble Sans Frontière
"Mahler: Das Lied Von Der Erde" – Kenneth Slowik, conductor; The Smithsonian Chamber Players & Santa Fe Pro Musica
"Music for Compline" – Stile Antico
"Stravinsky: Apollo, Concerto in D; Prokofiev: 20 Visions Fugitives" – Yuri Bashmet, conductor; Moscow Soloists

Best Classical Vocal Performance
"Gitano: Zarzuela Arias"
Rolando Villazón (Plácido Domingo; Orquesta De La Comunidad De Madrid)
"Homage: The Age of the Diva"
Renée Fleming (Valery Gergiev; Orchestra Of The Mariinsky Theatre)
"Lorraine Hunt Lieberson Sings Peter Lieberson: Neruda Songs"
Lorraine Hunt Lieberson (James Levine; Boston Symphony Orchestra)
"Russian Album"
Anna Netrebko (Valery Gergiev; Orchestra Of The Mariinsky Theatre)
"Sea Pictures, Op. 37"
Sarah Connolly (Simon Wright; Bournemouth Symphony Chorus; Bournemouth Symphony Orchestra)

Best Classical Contemporary Composition
"Amargós: Northern Concerto"
Joan Albert Amargós (Lan Shui, conductor; Danish National Symphony Orchestra/DR)
"Chesky: Concerto for Bassoon and Orchestra"
David Chesky (Rossen Gergov, conductor; Symphony Orchestra Of Norrlands Opera)
"Higdon: Zaka"
Jennifer Higdon (Eighth Blackbird)
"Lorraine Hunt Lieberson Sings Peter Lieberson: Neruda Songs"
Peter Lieberson (James Levine, conductor; Boston Symphony Orchestra)
"Made in America"
Joan Tower (Leonard Slatkin, conductor; Nashville Symphony Orchestra)

Best Classical Crossover Album
The Jazz Album: Watch What Happens – Thomas Quasthoff
A Love Supreme: The Legacy of John Coltrane – Turtle Island String QuartetSpirit of the Season – Craig Jessop & Mack Wilberg, conductors (Mormon Tabernacle Choir; Orchestra At Temple Square)
Whirled Chamber Music – Quartet San Francisco
Wolfgang's Big Night Out – Brian Setzer (The Brian Setzer Orchestra)

Comedy
Best Comedy AlbumThe Distant Future – Flight of the Conchords
America's Mexican – George Lopez
Dirty Girl – Lisa Lampanelli
I Still Have a Pony – Steven Wright
Songs Pointed & Pointless – Harry Shearer

Country
Best Female Country Vocal Performance
"Simple Love" – Alison Krauss
"Famous in a Small Town" – Miranda Lambert
"Nothin' Better to Do" – LeAnn Rimes
"Before He Cheats" – Carrie Underwood
"Heaven, Heartache, and the Power of Love" – Trisha Yearwood

Best Male Country Vocal Performance
"Long Trip Alone" – Dierks Bentley
"A Woman's Love" – Alan Jackson
"If You're Reading This" – Tim McGraw
"Give It Away" – George Strait
"Stupid Boy" – Keith Urban

Best Country Performance by a Duo or Group with Vocal
"Proud of the House We Built" – Brooks & Dunn
"How Long" – Eagles
"Moments" – Emerson Drive
"Lucky Man" – Montgomery Gentry
"Sweet Memories" – The Time Jumpers

Best Country Collaboration with Vocals
"Days Aren't Long Enough" – Steve Earle & Allison Moorer
"Because of You" – Reba McEntire & Kelly Clarkson
"I Need You" – Tim McGraw & Faith Hill
"Lost Highway" – Willie Nelson & Ray Price
"Oh Love" – Brad Paisley & Carrie Underwood

Best Country Instrumental Performance
"Little Monk" – Russ Barenberg
"Mucky the Duck" – The Greencards
"Throttleneck" – Brad Paisley
"Rawhide!" – Andy Statman
"Fidoodlin" – The Time Jumpers

Best Country Song
"Before He Cheats"
Josh Kear & Chris Tompkins, songwriters (Carrie Underwood)
"Give It Away"
Bill Anderson, Buddy Cannon & Jamey Johnson, songwriters (George Strait)
"I Need You"
Tony Lane & David Lee, songwriters (Tim McGraw featuring Faith Hill)
"If You're Reading This"
Tim McGraw, Brad Warren & Brett Warren, songwriters (Tim McGraw)
"Long Trip Alone"
Brett Beavers, Dierks Bentley & Steve Bogard, songwriters (Dierks Bentley)

Best Country Album
Long Trip Alone – Dierks Bentley
These Days – Vince Gill
Let It Go – Tim McGraw
5th Gear – Brad Paisley
It Just Comes Natural – George Strait

Dance
Best Dance Recording
"LoveStoned/I Think She Knows Interlude" – Justin Timberlake
Nate (Danja) Hills, Timbaland & Justin Timberlake, producers; Jimmy Douglass & Timbaland, mixers
"Do It Again" – The Chemical Brothers
Tom Rowlands & Ed Simons, producers
"D.A.N.C.E." – Justice
Gaspard Auge & Xavier de Rosnay, producers; Gaspard Auge & Xavier de Rosnay, mixers
"Love Today" – Mika
Jodi Marr, John Merchant, Mika & Greg Wells, producers; Greg Wells, mixer
"Don't Stop the Music" – Rihanna
StarGate, producer; Phil Tan, mixer

Best Electronic/Dance Album
We Are the Night – The Chemical Brothers
† – Justice
Sound of Silver – LCD Soundsystem
We Are Pilots – Shiny Toy Guns
Elements of Life – Tiësto

Folk
Best Traditional Folk Album
Dirt Farmer – Levon Helm
Try Me One More Time – David Bromberg
Let Us Now Praise Sleepy John – Peter Case
Banjo Talkin – Cathy Fink
Charlie Louvin – Charlie Louvin

Best Contemporary Folk Album
Washington Square Serenade – Steve Earle
The Calling – Mary Chapin Carpenter
My Name Is Buddy – Ry Cooder
Children Running Through – Patty Griffin
Orphans: Brawlers, Bawlers & Bastards – Tom Waits

Best Bluegrass Album
The Bluegrass Diaries – Jim Lauderdale
Cherryholmes II: Black and White – Cherryholmes
Lefty's Old Guitar – J. D. Crowe and The New South
Scenechronized – The Seldom Scene
Double Banjo Bluegrass Spectacular – Tony Trischka

Best Native American Music Album
Totemic Flute Chants – Johnny Whitehorse
Oklahoma Style – Walter Ahhaitty & Friends
Watch This Dancer! – Black Lodge
The Ballad of Old Times – Davis Mitchell
Reconnections – R. Carlos Nakai, Cliff Sarde, William Eaton & Randy Wood

Best Hawaiian Music Album
Treasures of Hawaiian Slack Key Guitar – Various Artists
Ka Hikina O Ka Hau (The Coming of the Snow) – Keola Beamer
Hawaiiana – Tia Carrere
He'eia – Cyril Pahinui
Hawaiian Blossom – Raiatea Helm

Gospel
Best Gospel Performance
"Blessed & Highly Favored" – The Clark Sisters (tie)
"Never Gonna Break My Faith" – Aretha Franklin & Mary J. Blige (Featuring The Harlem Boys Choir) (tie)
"East to West" – Casting Crowns
"With Long Life" – Israel And New Breed Featuring T-Bone
"He Set My Life to Music" – CeCe Winans

Best Gospel Song
"Blessed & Highly Favored"
Karen Clark Sheard, songwriter (The Clark Sisters)
"East to West"
Mark Hall & Bernie Herms, songwriters (Casting Crowns)
"Encourage Yourself"
Donald Lawrence, songwriter (Donald Lawrence & The Tri–City Singers)
"Made to Love"
Cary Barlowe, Toby McKeehan, Jamie Moore & Aaron Rice, songwriters (TobyMac)
"Praise on the Inside"
James L. Moss, songwriter (J. Moss)

Best Rock or Rap Gospel Album
Before the Daylight's Shot – Ashley Cleveland
HIStory: Our Place In His Story – The Cross Movement
Open Book – Da' T.R.U.T.H.
The Reckoning – Pillar
Comatose – Skillet

Best Pop/Contemporary Gospel Album
A Deeper Level – Israel and New Breed
The Altar and the Door – Casting Crowns
True Beauty – Mandisa
Stand – Michael W. Smith
Portable Sounds – TobyMac

Best Southern/Country/Bluegrass Album
Salt of the Earth – Ricky Skaggs & The Whites
Amazing Grace – Bill & Gloria Gaither and the Homecoming Friends
Journey of Joy – Karen Peck & New River
Everybody's Brother – Billy Joe Shaver
Tell Someone – Kenny & Amanda Smith Band
I'll Fly Away: Country Hymns & Songs of Faith – Various Artists

Best Traditional Gospel Album
Live: One Last Time – The Clark Sisters
The Grand Finale': Encourage Yourself – Donald Lawrence & The Tri–City Singers
Life Changing – Smokie Norful
Thirsty – Marvin Sapp
Cherch – Bebe Winans

Best Contemporary R&B Gospel Album
Free to Worship – Fred Hammond
Grateful – Coko
V2 ...– J. Moss
T57 – Trin-i-tee 5:7
Alone But Not Alone – Marvin Winans

Jazz
Best Contemporary Jazz Album
River: The Joni Letters – Herbie Hancock
Party Hats – Will Bernard
Downright Upright – Brian Bromberg
Re–imagination – Eldar
He Had a Hat – Jeff Lorber

Best Jazz Vocal Album
Avant Gershwin – Patti Austin
Red Earth: A Malian Journey – Dee Dee Bridgewater
Music Maestro Please – Freddy Cole
Nightmoves – Kurt Elling
On the Other Side – Tierney Sutton

Best Jazz Instrumental Solo Performance
"Anagram" – Michael Brecker
"Levees" – Terence Blanchard
"Both Sides Now– Herbie Hancock
"Lullaby" – Hank Jones
"1000 Kilometers" – Paul McCandless

Best Jazz Instrumental Album, Individual or Group
Pilgrimage – Michael Brecker
Live at the Village Vanguard – The Bill Charlap Trio
Kids: Live at Dizzy's Club Coca-Cola – Joe Lovano and Hank Jones
Line by Line – John Patitucci
Back East – Joshua Redman

Best Large Jazz Ensemble Album
A Tale of God's Will (A Requiem for Katrina) – Terence Blanchard
Eternal Licks & Grooves: Limited Edition – Bob Florence
Hommage – The Bill Holman Band
Sky Blue – Maria Schneider Orchestra
With Love – Charles Tolliver Big Band

Best Latin Jazz Album
Funk Tango – Paquito D'Rivera Quintet
The Magician – Sammy Figueroa and his Latin Jazz Explosion
Borrowed Time – Steve Khan
Refugee – Hector Martignon
Big Band Urban Folktales – Bobby Sanabria Big Band

Latin
Best Latin Pop Album
Papito – Miguel Bosé
12 Segundos de Oscuridad – Jorge Drexler
Navidades – Luis Miguel
Dicen Que el Tiempo – Jennifer Peña
El Tren de los Momentos – Alejandro Sanz

Best Latin Rock or Alternative Album
No Hay Espacio – Black Guayaba
Adelantando – Jarabe De Palo
Amantes Sunt Amentes – Panda
Kamikaze – Los Rabanes
Memo Rex Commander y el Corazón Atómico de la Vía Láctea – Zoé

Best Latin Urban Album
E.S.L. – Akwid
El Abayarde Contraataca – Tego Calderón
Residente O Visitante – Calle 13
El Cartel: The Big Boss – Daddy Yankee
Vacaneria! – Fulanito

Best Tropical Latin Album
Greetings From Havana – Cubanismo
En Primera Plana – Issac Delgado
Arroz con Habichuela – El Gran Combo De Puerto Rico
La Llave de mi Corazón – Juan Luis Guerra
United We Swing – Spanish Harlem Orchestra

Best Mexican/Mexican–American Album
100% Mexicano – Pepe Aguilar
El Indomable – Cristian Castro
Para Siempre – Vicente Fernández
Puro Dolor – Paquita la del Barrio
Esta Tierra Es Tuya (This Land Is Your Land) – Sones De México Ensemble

Best Tejano Album
Ram Herrera and the Outlaw Band 2007 – Ram Herrera and the Outlaw Band
Before the Next Teardrop Falls – Little Joe & La Familia
Corazon de Oro – David Marez
35th Anniversary – Ruben Ramos
Vagar Libremente – Sunny Sauceda

Best Banda Album
Te Va a Gustar – El Chapo
Los Mejores Corridos – El Potro De Sinaloa
Lobo Domesticado – Valentin Elizalde
Conquistando Corazones – K-PAZ De La Sierra
Entre Copas y Botellas – Lupillo Rivera

Musical Show
Best Musical Show Album
Spring Awakening
Duncan Sheik, producer; Duncan Sheik, composer; Steven Sater, lyricist (Original Broadway Cast with Jonathan Groff, Lea Michele & Others)
A Chorus Line
David Caddick, producer (Marvin Hamlisch, composer; Edward Kleban, lyricist) (2006 New Cast Recording with Various Artists)
Company
Tommy Krasker, producer (Stephen Sondheim, composer/lyricist) (2006 Cast Recording with Raúl Esparza & Others)
Grey Gardens
Steven Epstein, producer (Scott Frankel, composer; Michael Korie, lyricist) (Original Broadway Cast with Christine Ebersole, Mary Louise Wilson & Others)
West Side Story
Nick Patrick, producer (Leonard Bernstein, composer; Stephen Sondheim, lyricist) (Vittorio Grigolo, Hayley Westenra, Connie Fisher & Others)

New Age
Best New Age Album
Crestone – Paul Winter Consort
Faces of the Sun – Peter Kater
Sacred Journey of Ku–Kai, Volume 3 – Kitarō
One Guitar – Ottmar Liebert
Southwest – Eric Tingstad

Pop
Best Female Pop Vocal Performance
"Rehab" – Amy Winehouse
"Candyman" – Christina Aguilera
"1234" – Feist
"Big Girls Don't Cry" – Fergie
"Say It Right" – Nelly Furtado

Best Male Pop Vocal Performance
"What Goes Around.../...Comes Around" – Justin Timberlake
"Everything" – Michael Bublé
"Belief" – John Mayer
"Best Days"-Matt White
"Dance Tonight" – Paul McCartney
"Amazing" – Seal

Grammy Award for Best Pop Performance by a Duo or Group with Vocals
"Makes Me Wonder" – Maroon 5
"(You Want to) Make a Memory" – Bon Jovi
"Home" – Daughtry
"Hey There Delilah" – Plain White T's
"Window in the Skies" – U2

Best Pop Collaboration With Vocals
"Gone Gone Gone (Done Moved On)" – Robert Plant & Alison Krauss
"Steppin' Out" – Tony Bennett & Christina Aguilera
"Beautiful Liar" – Beyoncé & Shakira
"The Sweet Escape" – Gwen Stefani & Akon
"Give It to Me" – Timbaland featuring Nelly Furtado & Justin Timberlake

Best Pop Instrumental Performance
"One Week Last Summer" – Joni Mitchell"Off the Grid" – Beastie Boys
"Paris Sunrise#7" – Ben Harper & The Innocent Criminals
"Over the Rainbow" – Dave Koz
"Simple Pleasures" – Spyro Gyra

Best Pop Instrumental AlbumThe Mix-Up - Beastie Boys
Italia – Chris Botti
At the Movies – Dave Koz
Good to Go-Go – Spyro Gyra
Roundtrip – Kirk Whalum

Best Traditional Pop Vocal Album
Call Me Irresponsible – Michael Bublé
Cool Yule – Bette Midler
Trav'lin' Light – Queen Latifah
Live in Concert 2006 – Barbra Streisand
James Taylor at Christmas – James Taylor

Best Pop Vocal Album
Back to Black – Amy Winehouse
Lost Highway – Bon Jovi
The Reminder – Feist
It Won't Be Soon Before Long – Maroon 5
Memory Almost Full – Paul McCartney

R&B
Best Female R&B Vocal Performance
"No One" – Alicia Keys
"Just Fine" – Mary J. Blige
"When I See U" – Fantasia
"If I Have My Way"– Chrisette Michele
"Hate on Me"– Jill Scott

Best Male R&B Vocal Performance
"Future Baby Mama" – Prince
"Woman" – Raheem DeVaughn
"B.U.D.D.Y." – Musiq Soulchild
"Because of You" – Ne-Yo
"Please Don't Go" – Tank

Grammy Award for Best R&B Performance by a Duo or Group with Vocals
"Disrespectful" – Chaka Khan & Mary J. Blige
"Same Girl" – R. Kelly & Usher
"Hate That I Love You" – Rihanna & Ne-Yo
"Baby"– Angie Stone & Betty Wright
"Bartender" – T-Pain & Akon

Best Traditional R&B Vocal Performance
"In My Songs" – Gerald Levert
"Walk a Mile In My Shoes" – Otis Clay
"All Night Long" – Randy Crawford & Joe Sample
"I Apologize" – Ann Nesby
"I Am Your Man" – Ryan Shaw

Best Urban/Alternative Performance
"Daydreamin'" – Lupe Fiasco & Jill Scott
"Make a Baby" – Vikter Duplaix
"That's the Way of the World" – Dwele
"Fantasy" – Meshell Ndegeocello
"Dream" – Alice Smith

Best R&B Song
"No One"
songwriters; Dirty Harry, Kerry Brothers & Alicia Keys (Alicia Keys)
"Beautiful Flower"
songwriters; India.Arie & Joyce Simpson (India.Arie)
"Hate That I Love You"
songwriters; M.S. Eriksen, T.E. Hermansen & Shaffer Smith (Rihanna featuring Ne-Yo)
"Teachme"
songwriters; Ivan Barias, Adam W. Blackstone, Randall C. Bowland, Carvin Haggins, Johnnie Smith II & Corey Latif Williams (Musiq Soulchild)
"When I See U"
songwriters; Louis Biancaniello, Waynne Nugent, Erika Nuri, Kevin Risto, Janet Sewel & Sam Watters (Fantasia)

Best R&B Album
Funk This – Chaka Khan
Lost & Found – Ledisi
Luvanmusiq – Musiq Soulchild
The Real Thing – Jill Scott
Sex, Love & Pain – Tank

Best Contemporary R&B Album
Because of You – Ne-Yo
Konvicted – Akon
Just Like You – Keyshia Cole
Fantasia – Fantasia
East Side Story – Emily King

Rap
Best Rap Solo Performance
"Stronger" – Kanye West
"The People" – Common
"I Get Money" – 50 Cent
"Show Me What You Got" – Jay-Z
"Big Things Poppin' (Do It)" – T.I.

Best Rap Performance by a Duo or Group
"Southside" – Common featuring Kanye West
"Make It Rain" – Fat Joe featuring Lil Wayne
"Int'l Players Anthem (I Choose You)" – UGK featuring OutKast
"Party Like A Rockstar" – Shop Boyz
"Better Than I've Ever Been" – Kanye West, Nas & KRS-One

Best Rap/Sung Collaboration
"Umbrella" – Rihanna featuring Jay-Z
"I Wanna Love You" – Akon featuring Snoop Dogg
"Kiss Kiss" – Chris Brown & T-Pain
"Let It Go" – Keyshia Cole featuring Missy Elliott & Lil' Kim
"Good Life" – Kanye West featuring T-Pain

Best Rap Song
"Good Life"
 A. Davis, F. Najm & K. West, songwriters; (Kanye West & T-Pain)
"Ayo Technology"
 Nate (Danja) Hills, Curtis Jackson, Timothy Mosley & Justin Timberlake, songwriters; (50 Cent featuring Justin Timberlake & Timbaland)
"Big Things Poppin' (Do It)"
 Clifford Harris & Byron Thomas, songwriters (T.I.)
"Can't Tell Me Nothing"
 A. Davis & Kanye West, songwriters (Kanye West)
"Crank That (Soulja Boy)"
 Soulja Boy Tell 'Em, songwriter (Soulja Boy Tell 'Em)

Best Rap Album
Graduation – Kanye WestFinding Forever – Common
Kingdom Come – Jay-Z
Hip Hop Is Dead – Nas
T.I. vs. T.I.P. – T.I.

Reggae
Best Reggae AlbumMind Control – Stephen Marley
The Burning Spear Experience – Burning Spear
The End of an American Dream – Lee "Scratch" Perry
Anniversary – Sly & Robbie and the Taxi Gang
Light Your Light – Toots & The Maytals

Rock
Best Solo Rock Vocal Performance
"Radio Nowhere" – Bruce Springsteen
"Timebomb" – Beck
"Only Mama Knows" – Paul McCartney
"Our Country" – John Mellencamp
"Come On" – Lucinda Williams

Best Rock Performance by a Duo or Group with Vocal
"Icky Thump" – The White Stripes
"It's Not Over" – Daughtry
"Working Class Hero" – Green Day
"If Everyone Cared" – Nickelback
"Instant Karma" – U2

Best Hard Rock Performance
"The Pretender" – Foo Fighters
"Sweet Sacrifice" – Evanescence
"I Don't Wanna Stop" – Ozzy Osbourne
"Sick, Sick, Sick" – Queens of the Stone Age
"The Pot" – Tool

Best Metal Performance
"Final Six" – Slayer
"Nothing Left" – As I Lay Dying
"Never Ending Hill" – King Diamond
"Aesthetics of Hate" – Machine Head
"Redemption" – Shadows Fall

Best Rock Instrumental Performance
"Once Upon a Time in the West"– Bruce Springsteen
"The Ecstasy of Gold" – Metallica
"Malignant Narcissism" – Rush
"Always with Me, Always with You" – Joe Satriani
"The Attitude Song" – Steve Vai

Best Rock Song
"Radio Nowhere"
songwriter; Bruce Springsteen (Bruce Springsteen)
"Come On"
songwriter; Lucinda Williams (Lucinda Williams)
"Icky Thump"
songwriter; Jack White (The White Stripes)
"It's Not Over"
songwriters; Chris Daughtry, Gregg Wattenberg, Mark Wilkerson & Brett Young (Daughtry)
"The Pretender"
songwriters; Dave Grohl, Taylor Hawkins, Nate Mendel & Chris Shiflett (Foo Fighters)

Best Rock Album
Echoes, Silence, Patience & Grace – Foo Fighters
Daughtry – Daughtry
Revival – John Fogerty
Magic – Bruce Springsteen
Sky Blue Sky – Wilco

World Music
Best Traditional World Music Album
African Spirit – Soweto Gospel Choir
When the Soul Is Settled: Music of Iraq – Rahim Al Haj With Souhail Kaspa
From Mali to America – Cheick Hamala Diabat & Bob Carlin
Live at Couleur Café – Konono Nº1
Singing for Life: Songs of Hope, Healing, and HIV/AIDS in Uganda – Various Artists

Best Contemporary World Music Album
Djin Djin – Angelique Kidjo
CéU – Céu
Gil Luminoso – Gilberto Gil
Momento – Bebel Gilberto
An Ancient Muse – Loreena McKennitt

Best Zydeco Or Cajun Music Album
Live! Worldwide – Terrance Simien and the Zydeco Experience
Le Cowboy Creole – Geno Delafose & French Rockin' Boogie
King Cake – Lisa Haley
Live: Á La Blue Moon – Lost Bayou Ramblers
Blues De Musicien – Pine Leaf Boys
Racines – Racines
The La Louisianne Sessions – Roddie Romero and the Hub City All–Stars

Best Polka Album
Come Share the Wine –  Jimmy Sturr & His Orchestra
Polka's Revenge – Brave Combo
Bulletproof Polkas – John Gora & Gorale
Polka Freak Out – Bubba Hernandez & Alex Meixner
Dueling Polkas – Walter Ostanek and His Band & Brian Sklar and the Western Senators

Spoken Word
Best Spoken Word Album
The Audacity of Hope : Thoughts on Reclaiming the American Dream – Barack Obama
Celebrations – Maya Angelou
Giving: How Each of Us Can Change the World – Bill Clinton
Sunday Mornings in Plains: Bringing Peace to a Changing World – Jimmy Carter
Things I Overheard While Talking to Myself – Alan Alda

Film, Television and Other Visual Media
Best Compilation Soundtrack Album
Love – George Martin & Giles Martin (The Beatles)
Across The Universe – Various Artists
Dreamgirls – Various Artists
Hairspray – Various Artists
Once – Glen Hansard & Markéta Irglová

Best Score Soundtrack Album
Ratatouille – Michael Giacchino
Babel – Gustavo Santaolalla
Blood Diamond – James Newton Howard
The Departed – Howard Shore
Happy Feet – John Powell
Pan's Labyrinth – Javier Navarrete

Best Song Written for a Motion Picture, Television or Other Visual Media
"Love You I Do" (from Dreamgirls)
Siedah Garrett & Henry Krieger, songwriters (Jennifer Hudson)
"Falling Slowly" (from Once)
Glen Hansard & Marketa Irglova, songwriters (Glen Hansard & Markéta Irglová)
"Guaranteed" (from Into the Wild)
Eddie Vedder, songwriter (Eddie Vedder)
"Song of the Heart" (From Happy Feet)
Prince Rogers Nelson, songwriter (Prince)
"You Know My Name" (from Casino Royale)
David Arnold & Chris Cornell, songwriters (Chris Cornell)

Composing/Arranging
Best Instrumental Composition
"Cerulean Skies"
Maria Schneider, composer (Maria Schneider Orchestra)
"Ash Wednesday"
Harry Connick Jr., composer (Harry Connick Jr.)
"Deep Six"
Mark Walker, composer (Oregon)
"I Knew Her"
Philip Glass, composer (Philip Glass)
"Spectacle"
Béla Fleck, composer (Chick Corea & Béla Fleck)

Best Instrumental Arrangement
"In a Silent Way"
Vince Mendoza, arranger (Joe Zawinul)
"Ash Wednesday"
Harry Connick Jr., arranger (Harry Connick Jr.)
"Besame Mucho"
Steve Wiest, arranger (Maynard Ferguson)
"Black Is the Color of My True Love's Hair"
Frank Macchia, arranger (Frank Macchia & The Prague Orchestra)
"Yo Tannenbaum (From Bah, Humduck! A Looney Tunes Christmas)"
Gordon Goodwin, arranger (Gordon Goodwin's Big Phat Band)

Best Instrumental Arrangement Accompanying Vocalist(s)
"I'm Gonna Live Till I Die"
John Clayton, arranger (Queen Latifah)
"Cry Me a River"
Jorge Calandrelli, arranger (Ella Fitzgerald & Jorge Calandrelli)
"In the Wee Small Hours of the Morning"
Jay Ashby, Darmon Meader & Kim Nazarian, arrangers (New York Voices)
"Overture/Gershwin Medley"
Michael Abene, arranger (Patti Austin)
"Smile"
Pete McGuinness, arranger (The Pete McGuinness Jazz Orchestra)

Package 
Best Recording Package
Cassadaga
Zack Nipper, art director (Bright Eyes)
The Dio Years
Masaki Koike, art director (Black Sabbath)
Friend & Foe
Craig Thompson, art director (Menomena)
Secrets Keep You Sick
Don Clark, art director (The Fold)
White Horse
Qing-Yang Xiao, art director (GTS)

Best Boxed/Special Limited Edition
What It Is!: Funky Soul and Rare Grooves (1967–1977)
Masaki Koike, art director (Various Artists)
The Black Parade
Special Edition- Matt Taylor, Ellen Wakayama & Gerard Way, art directors (My Chemical Romance)
A Fever You Can't Sweat Out
Limited Edition Collectible Deluxe Box- Alex Kirzhner, art director (Panic! At The Disco)
Icky Thump
Limited Edition USB Flash Drive- Stan Chow, art director (The White Stripes)
Venus Doom
Matt Taylor & Ville Valo, art directors (HIM)

Album Notes 
Best Album Notes
John Work III: Recording Black Culture
Bruce Nemerov (Various Artists)
Actionable Offenses: Indecent Phonograph Recordings from the 1890s 
Patrick Feaster and David Giovannoni (Various Artists)
Classic Chu Berry Columbia and Victor Sessions
Loren Schoenberg (Leon "Chu" Berry)
Off the Record: The Complete 1923 Jazz Band Recordings
David Sager ("King" Oliver's Creole Jazz Band)
Ricky Jay Plays Poker
Ricky Jay (Various Artists)

Historical
Best Historical Album
The Live Wire: Woody Guthrie in Performance 1949
Nora Guthrie & Jorge Arévalo Mateus, compilation producers; Jamie Howarth, Steve Rosenthal, Warren Russell-Smith & Dr. Kevin Short, mastering engineers (Woody Guthrie)
Actionable Offenses: Indecent Phonograph Recordings from the 1890s
David Giovannoni, Meagan Hennessey & Richard Martin, compilation producers; Richard Martin, mastering engineer (Various Artists)
Forever Changing: The Golden Age of Elektra Records 1963-1973 (Deluxe Edition)
Stuart Batsford, Mick Houghton & Phil Smee, compilation producers; Dan Hersch & Bill Inglot, mastering engineers (Various Artists)
Love Is the Song We Sing: San Francisco Nuggets 1965-1970
Alec Palao, compilation producer; Dan Hersch, Bill Inglot & Dave Schultz, mastering engineers (Various Artists)
People Take Warning! Murder Ballads & Disaster Songs 1913-1938
Christopher King & Henry "Hank" Sapoznik, compilation producers; Christopher King & Robert Vosgien, mastering engineers (Various Artists)

Production, Non Classical
Best Engineered Album, Non Classical
Beauty & Crime
Tchad Blake, Cameron Craig, Emery Dobyns & Jimmy Hogarth, engineers (Suzanne Vega)
Destination Moon
Dave O'Donnell & Elliot Scheiner, engineers (Deborah Cox)
Don't Mess With the Dragon
Robert Carranza, Serban Ghenea, John Hanes & KC Porter, engineers (Ozomatli)
Floratone
Tucker Martine, engineer (Floratone)
II
Jason Lehning, engineer (Viktor Krauss)

Producer of the Year, Non Classical
Mark Ronson
"Back to Black" (Amy Winehouse) (T)
"Littlest Things" (Lily Allen) (T)
"Rehab" (Amy Winehouse) (T)
Version (Mark Ronson) (A)
"You Know I'm No Good" (Amy Winehouse) (T)
Howard Benson
Daughtry (Daughtry) (A)
Devils & Angels (Mêlée) (A)
Direction (The Starting Line) (A)
Five Score and Seven Years Ago (Relient K) (A)
Stay Inside (Sound the Alarm) (A)
Joe Chiccarelli
Mercy (Burden Brothers) (A)
The Narcotic Story (Oxbow) (A)
Nightmoves (Kurt Elling) (A)
Wincing the Night Away (The Shins) (A)
Mike Elizondo
It Won't Be Soon Before Long (Maroon 5) (A)
Under the Blacklight (Rilo Kiley) (A)
Timbaland
Come Around (M.I.A. featuring Timbaland) (T)
"Give It to Me" (Timbaland featuring Nelly Furtado & Justin Timberlake) (T)
Make Me Better (Fabolous featuring Ne-Yo) (S)
Timbaland Presents: Shock Value (Timbaland) (A)
"The Way I Are (Timbaland featuring Keri Hilson & D.O.E.) (S)

Best Remixed Recording
"Bring the Noise" (Benny Benassi Pump-Kin Remix)
Benny Benassi, remixer (Public Enemy)
"Angelicus" (Andy Moor Full Length Mix)
Andy Moor, remixer (Delerium featuring Isabel Bayrakdarian)
"Like a Child" (Carl Craig Remix)
Carl Craig, remixer (Junior Boys)
"Proper Education" (Club Mix - Radio Edit)
Eric Prydz, remixer (Eric Prydz vs. Pink Floyd)
"Sorry" (Dirty South Mix)
Dirty South, remixer (Kaskade)

Production, Surround Sound
Best Surround Sound Album
Love
Paul Hicks, surround mix engineer; Tim Young, surround mastering engineer; George Martin & Giles Martin, surround producers (The Beatles)
At War With the Mystics 5.1
The Flaming Lips & Dave Fridmann, surround mix engineers; The Flaming Lips & Dave Fridmann, surround mastering engineers; The Flaming Lips & Dave Fridmann, surround producers (The Flaming Lips)
Fear of a Blank Planet
Steven Wilson, surround mix engineer; Darcy Proper, surround mastering engineer; Porcupine Tree, surround producers (Porcupine Tree)
Grechaninov: Passion Week
John Newton, surround mix engineer; Jonathan Cooper, surround mastering engineer; Blanton Alspaugh, surround producer (Charles Bruffy, Kansas City Chorale & Phoenix Bach Choir)
Vaughan Williams: Symphony No. 5; Fantasia on a Theme by Thomas Tallis; Serenade to Music
Michael Bishop, surround mix engineer; Michael Bishop, surround mastering engineer; Elaine Martone, surround producer (Robert Spano & Atlanta Symphony Orchestra & Chamber Chorus)

Production, Classical
Best Engineered Album, Classical
Garden of Dreams
Keith O. Johnson, engineer (Jerry Junkin & Dallas Wind Symphony)
Grechaninov: Passion Week
John Newton, engineer (Charles Bruffy, Phoenix Bach Choir & Kansas City Chorale)
Nielsen: Clarinet & Flute Concertos
Arne Akselberg & Tobias Lehmann, engineers (Sabine Meyer, Emmanuel Pahud & Simon Rattle)
Spirit of the Season
Bruce Leek, Fred Vogler & Trent Walker, engineers (Craig Jessop, Mack Wilberg & Mormon Tabernacle Choir)
Strauss: Don Juan, Death and Transfiguration
Lawrence Rock, engineer (Lorin Maazel & New York Philharmonic)

Producer of the Year, Classical
Blanton Alspaugh
 Eternal Rest: Mäntyjärvi, Ticheli, Martin, Clausen (Charles Bruffy, Phoenix Bach Choir & Kansas City Chorale)
 Grechaninov: Passion Week (Charles Bruffy, Phoenix Bach Choir & Kansas City Chorale)
 The Harrington String Quartet: Daniel McCarthy (The Harrington String Quartet)
 Hartke: The Greater Good (Stewart Robertson & Glimmerglass Opera Orchestra)
 Rider On The Plains: Cello Concertos By Virgil Thomson And Charles Fussell (Emmanuel Feldman)
John Fraser
 Chopin: Piano Sonata No. 2, Scherzos (Simon Trpceski)
 Great Handel (Ian Bostridge)
 Kate Royal (Kate Royal)
 Krommer/Spohr: Clarinet Concertos (Julian Bliss, Sabine Meyer & Kenneth Sillito)
 Schubert: Piano Sonata D958, Lieder, Fragments (Leif Ove Andsnes & Ian Bostridge)
Marina A. Ledin
 Balakirev And Russian Folksong (Joseph Banowetz)
 Louisiana - A Pianist's Journey (Kenneth Boulton)
 Piano Impromptus (Jungran Kim Khwarg)
 20th Century Piano Sonatas (Allison Brewster Franzetti)
Judith Sherman
 American Virtuosa: Tribute To Maud Powell (Rachel Barton Pine & Matthew Hagle)
 From Barrelhouse To Broadway: The Musical Odyssey Of Joe Jordan (Rick Benjamin & The Paragon Ragtime Orchestra)
 Górecki: String Quartet No. 3 '...Songs Are Sung' (Kronos Quartet)
 Strange Imaginary Animals (Eighth Blackbird)
 Tchaikovsky: Three String Quartets, Souvenir De Florence (Ying Quartet)
Robina G. Young
 As Steals The Morn...Handel Arias & Scenes For Tenor (Mark Padmore, Andrew Manze & The English Concert)
 Bach, CPE: Symphonies 1–4, Cello Concerto (Andrew Manze & The English Concert)
 Brahms: Variations (Olga Kern)
 Music For Compline (Stile Antico)
 Stockhausen: Stimmung (Paul Hillier & Theatre Of Voices)

Music Video
Best Short Form Music Video
"God's Gonna Cut You Down" – Johnny Cash
Tony Kaye, video director; Rachel Curl, video producer
"1234" – Feist
Patrick Daughters, video director; Geoff McLean, video producer
"Gone Daddy Gone" – Gnarls Barkley
Chris Milk, video director; Barbara Benson, video producer
"D.A.N.C.E." – Justice
Jonas & François and So-Me, video directors and producers
"Typical" – Mutemath
Israel Anthem, video director; Brandon Arolfo, video producer

Best Long Form Music Video
The Confessions Tour – Madonna
Jonas Akerlund, video director; Sara Martin and David May, video producers
Live and Loud at the Fillmore – Dierks Bentley
Russell Thomas, video director; James Whetherly, video producer
Trapped in the Closet: Chapters 13-22 – R. Kelly
R. Kelly, Jim Swaffield and Victor Mignatti, video directors; Ann Carli, video producer
10 Days Out: Blues from the Backroads – Kenny Wayne Shepherd and various artists
Noble Jones, video director; Kenny Wayne Shepherd, video producer
Liberacion: Songs of the Cuban Underground – Various artists
Reuben Field, video director; Dean Bates, video producer

In Memoriam 
Brad Delp, Boots Randolph, James B. Davis, Max Roach, Robert Goulet, Lee Hazlewood, Pimp C, Gian Carlo Menotti, Joe Zawinul, Joel Dorn, Ray Evans, Lucky Dube, Al Viola, Mstislav Rostropovich, Joel Brodsky, Hilly Kristal, Diane Ogden-Halder, Joe Hunter, Don Ho, Dan Fogelberg, Porter Wagoner, Beverly Sills, Teresa Brewer, Hy Weiss, Tom Noonan, Bobby Byrd, Tommy Makem, John Stewart, Arthur Shimkin, Carlos "Patato" Valdes, Clyde Otis, Luther Ingram, Hank Thompson, Ike Turner, Oscar Peterson and Luciano Pavarotti.

References

External links
 Top 10 Grammy Performances
 NARAS
 CBS GRAMMY Site

 050
2008 in American music
2008 in California
2008 music awards
2008 in Los Angeles
2008 awards in the United States
February 2008 events in the United States